Macquarie Fields railway station is located on the Main South line, serving the Sydney suburb of Macquarie Fields. It is served by Sydney Trains T8 Airport & South line services.

History
Macquarie Fields station opened on 3 October 1888.

An additional track was opened to the west of the station in 1995 as part of the Glenfield - Ingleburn passing loop. This unelectrified track was used by freight and long-distance passenger trains. In December 2012, the track was incorporated into the Southern Sydney Freight Line and became freight only.

It has been reported that a ghost of a teenage girl haunts the station, where screaming is often heard at night after train services have stopped. In July 1906, a woman named Emily Gengeson was reportedly ran over and killed by a train.

Since the second half of 2017, Macquarie Fields railway station has been served exclusively by the Airport and East Hills line, meaning commuters have to change at Glenfield to travel to either the city via Granville or to Blacktown via the Cumberland Line.

Platforms & services

Transport links
Interline Bus Services operates one route to and from Macquarie Fields station:
876: to Eucalyptus Drive, peak extension to Long Point

References

External links

Macquarie Fields station details Transport for New South Wales

Railway stations in Sydney
Railway stations in Australia opened in 1888
Macquarie Fields, New South Wales
Main Southern railway line, New South Wales